The 2009 FIM Speedway World Championship Grand Prix of Poland was the eleventh and a last race of the 2009 Speedway Grand Prix season. It took place on 17 October in the Polonia Stadium in Bydgoszcz, Poland.

The 13th Bydgoszcz Grand Prix was won by Nicki Pedersen who beat Leigh Adams, Sebastian Ułamek and Rune Holta in the final.

Riders 

The Speedway Grand Prix Commission nominated Adrian Miedziński as the wild card and Grzegorz Zengota and Krzysztof Buczkowski as the track reserves. The riders' starting positions draw for Grand Prix meeting was made on 16 October at 13:00 CEST by Deputy Mayor of Bydgoszcz Maciej Grześkowiak.

Heat details

Heat after heat 
 (65,25) Gollob, Crump, Andersen, Harris
 (65,75 Adams, Hancock, Walasek, Lindgren (F4)
 (65,37) Pedersen, Jonsson, Nicholls, Ułamek
 (66,06) Holta, Sayfutdinov, Bjerre, Miedziński
 (65,05) Ułamek, Crump, Hancock, Holta
 (65,13) Sayfutdinov, Walasek, Nicholls, Andersen
 (65,65) Jonsson, Lindgren, Bjerre, Harris
 (64,94) Gollob, Adams, Pedersen, Miedziński
 (65,31) Miedziński, Jonsson, Crump, Walasek
 (65,40) Pedersen, Hancock, Andersen, Bjerre
 (65,50) Ułamek, Adams, Sayfutdinov, Harris
 (65,12) Holta, Lindgren, Gollob, Nicholls
 (65,37) Crump, Pedersen, Sayfutdinov, Lindgren
 (65,53) Holta, Jonsson, Andersen, Adams
 (65,35) Hancock, Miedziński, Nicholls, Harris
 (65,28) Bjerre, Ułamek, Gollob, Walasek
 (66,31) Bjerre, Adams, Nicholls, Crump
 (66,69) Ułamek, Lindgren, Miedziński, Andersen
 (65,71) Harris, Holta, Pedersen, Walasek
 (64,97) Gollob, Jonsson, Sayfutdinov, Hancock
 Semi-finals:
 (65,91) Ułamek, Adams, Jonsson, Bjerre
 (65,60) Holta, Pedersen, Crump, Gollob (X)
 The Final:
 (65,56) Pedersen (6 points), Adams (4 points), Ułamek (2 points), Holta

The intermediate classification

See also 
 Speedway Grand Prix
 List of Speedway Grand Prix riders

References

External links 
 FIM-live.com

P
2009
2009